In the Land of Hi-Fi is the fifth studio album by the blues, R&B and jazz singer Dinah Washington, released in 1956 on the Emarcy label. The album includes a mix of  jazz, popular and blues standards of the period, all selected to emphasize the vocalist's style.

Critical reception
AllMusic characterized the album as "yet another impressive set among the many fine EmArcy records Washington cut in the '50s."

Track listing
"Our Love Is Here to Stay" (George Gershwin, Ira Gershwin) – 3:06
"Let Me Love You" (Bart Howard) – 2:09
"There'll Be a Jubilee" (Phil Moore) – 2:06
"My Ideal" (Newell Chase, Leo Robin, Richard Whiting) – 2:19
"I've Got a Crush on You" (Gershwin, Gershwin) – 3:03
"Let's Do It (Let's Fall in Love)" (Cole Porter) – 2:36
"Nothing Ever Changes My Love for You" (Marvin Fisher, Jack Segal) – 2:33
"What'll I Tell My Heart" (Jack Lawrence, Peter Tinturin) – 3:16
"On the Sunny Side of the Street" (Dorothy Fields, Jimmy McHugh) – 2:26
"Say It Isn't So" (Irving Berlin) – 2:40
"Sometimes I'm Happy" (Irving Caesar, Clifford Grey, Vincent Youmans) – 2:16
"If I Were a Bell" (Frank Loesser) – 2:04

Personnel
Dinah Washington – Lead Vocals
Cannonball Adderley – alto saxophone
Dennis Drake – remastering
Ellie Hughes – graphic design
Tom Hughes – graphic design
Junior Mance – piano 	
Hal Mooney – arranger, conductor
Seth Rothstein – production 	
Richard Seidel – production  	
Bob Shad – producer

References

Dinah Washington albums
1956 albums
EmArcy Records albums
Albums produced by Bob Shad
Albums arranged by Hal Mooney
Albums conducted by Hal Mooney